John Wozniak is the name of:

John Wozniak (b. 1971), American musician and member of the band Marcy Playground
John Wozniak (American football) (1921–1982), American football player
John Wozniak (American football coach) (born 1977), American football coach
John N. Wozniak (b. 1956), State senator in the U.S. state of Pennsylvania